Tricia Cullop  (born April 24, 1971) is the current head coach of the University of Toledo women's basketball team.  She has led Toledo to three MAC regular-season and one MAC tournament championship.  She was the 2022 Carol Eckman Award winner for coaching integrity in women's college basketball.

Early life
Cullup played basketball at Purdue under head coach Lin Dunn. She was three-time Academic All-Big Ten. She earned a bachelor's degree in communications from Purdue University in 1993.

Coaching career
Early in her career she served as an assistant at Radford, Long Beach State, and Xavier.

Evansville
In 2000 she took over as the head coach at Evansville where she stayed for eight seasons with a 73–48 record.  In her final season in 2007–08 the Purple Aces won the Missouri Valley Conference and advanced to the second round of the WNIT.  She was 2008 MVC coach of the year.

Toledo
On April 18, 2008, she was named head coach at Toledo. Her teams have won three MAC championships in 2011, 2013, and 2022. Her 2016–17 team won the MAC tournament. They qualified for the NCAA tournament where they lost to Creighton in the first round. Her teams have played in the WNIT eight times including taking home the championship in the 2011 Tournament. She was name MAC coach of the Year in 2009, 2011, 2013 and 2022.

Head coaching record

References

External links
Toledo Rockets coaching bio

1971 births
Living people
American women's basketball coaches
Basketball coaches from Indiana
Basketball players from Indiana
Evansville Purple Aces women's basketball coaches
Long Beach State Beach women's basketball coaches
People from Knox County, Indiana
Purdue Boilermakers women's basketball players
Radford Highlanders women's basketball coaches
Toledo Rockets women's basketball coaches
Xavier Musketeers women's basketball coaches